WORG (100.3 FM) is a translator of Middletown, California radio station KLVR. Licensed to Elloree, South Carolina, United States, the station is currently owned by Educational Media Foundation and is a simulcast of KLVR in Sacramento.

References

External links

ORG
Radio stations established in 1992
Educational Media Foundation radio stations
1992 establishments in South Carolina